Glenn L. Henry (August 25, 1921 – January  23, 2002) was an American lawyer and politician.

Born in Tomah, Wisconsin, Henry went to grade and high school in Madison, Wisconsin. He served in the United States Navy from 1942 to 1946 and again from 1950 to 1952. He received his degree from the University of Wisconsin–Madison and his law degree from the University of Wisconsin Law School. He practiced law in Madison and served as Dane County assistant district attorney from 1947 to 1950 and from 1952 to 1953. Henry served on the Madison Common Council from 1956 to 1958, and on the Wisconsin State Assembly in 1959 as a Democrat. He died in Madison, Wisconsin.

Notes

1921 births
2002 deaths
Politicians from Madison, Wisconsin
People from Tomah, Wisconsin
University of Wisconsin–Madison alumni
University of Wisconsin Law School alumni
Wisconsin lawyers
Wisconsin city council members
20th-century American politicians
Lawyers from Madison, Wisconsin
20th-century American lawyers
United States Navy personnel of World War II
Democratic Party members of the Wisconsin State Assembly